"Vívela" is a song recorded by the Spanish singer-songwriter Pablo Alborán. The song was included on his third studio album, Terral. The song was released as the lead single from his second live album Tour Terral (Tres Noches en Las Ventas) (2015). It was released as a digital download and CD single and peaked at number 1 on the Spanish Singles Chart in October 2015.

Track listing

Chart performance

Weekly charts

Release history

See also
 List of number-one singles of 2015 (Spain)

References

2015 singles
2014 songs
Pablo Alborán songs
Number-one singles in Spain
Songs written by Pablo Alborán